Scott John David Kay (born 18 September 1989) is an English semi-professional footballer who plays for Ashton United .

Career
Kay, a lifelong Manchester City fan, started career coming through the Manchester City youth system, failing to make an appearance for the first team.

Macclesfield Town 
He signed for Football League Two side Macclesfield Town on 25 June 2011 on a free transfer after being released by City. He made his professional debut on 6 August 2011, in the opening day defeat to Dagenham & Redbridge at Moss Rose. In May 2012, Kay was released by Macclesfield due to the expiry of his contract.

Huddersfield Town 
After impressing trial over the summer catching the eye of Huddersfield Development Squad coach Steve Eyre who he had worked with at Manchester City, Kay was offered a short-term deal with the club to play in the Development Squad for the 2012–13 season.

Southport 
Kay joined Southport in January 2013 and went on to make 16 appearances for the club in the second half of the 2012–13 season.

Return to Macclesfield Town 
On 8 August 2013, Scott re signed for Macclesfield Town after having been on trial with the club in pre-season.

Return to Southport 
Scott returned to Southport on the 18 June 2014 ahead of the 2014–15 season, after his contract at Macclesfield Town expired.

FC United of Manchester 
He played three seasons for the club leaving in 2018.

Ashton United
In October 2018 he joined Ashton United.

References

External links

1989 births
Living people
People from Denton, Greater Manchester
English footballers
Association football midfielders
Manchester City F.C. players
Macclesfield Town F.C. players
Huddersfield Town A.F.C. players
Southport F.C. players
Mossley A.F.C. players
F.C. United of Manchester players
English Football League players
Ashton United F.C. players